The Men's sprint at the 2014 Commonwealth Games, was part of the cycling programme, which took place on 24 and 25 July 2014.

Results

Qualification

First round

First round repechage

Quarter-finals

Semi-finals

5th–8th Places

Finals

References

Men's sprint
Cycling at the Commonwealth Games – Men's sprint